Salah Jadid (1926 – 19 August 1993) was a Syrian general, a leader of the left-wing of the Arab Socialist Ba'ath Party in Syria, and the country's de facto leader from 1966 until 1970, when he was ousted by Hafez al-Assad's Corrective Movement.

Early life and career
Jadid was born in 1926 in the village of Dweir Baabda, near the coastal city of Jableh, to an Alawite family of the Haddadin tribe. However, there is another report stating his birth year as 1924. He studied at the Homs Military Academy, and entered the Syrian Army in 1946. Jadid was originally a member of the Syrian Social Nationalist Party (SSNP), but later became a member of the Arab Socialist Ba'ath Party, led by Michel Aflaq and Salah al-Din al-Bitar, in the 1950s through an associate of Akram al-Hawrani. Even so, Jadid remained close to the SSNP; his brother, Ghassan, was one of its most prominent members in Syria. He changed allegiance again in the 1950s, when he became a member of the Arab Nationalist Movement, a party supporting Gamal Abdel Nasser's ideological beliefs. Jadid supported Syria's ascension into the United Arab Republic (UAR), a union republic consisting of Egypt and Syria.

During the UAR-era, Jadid was stationed in Cairo, Egypt. Jadid established the Military Committee alongside other Ba'athists in 1959. The chief aim of the Military Committee was to protect the UAR's existence. In the beginning there were only four members of the Military Committee, the others were Hafez al-Assad, Abd al-Karim al-Jundi and Muhammad Umran. The Military Committee also tried to save the Syrian Ba'ath movement from annihilation. Committee members were among those who blamed Aflaq for the Ba'ath Party's failing during the UAR years. The party's Third National Congress in 1959 supported Aflaq's decision to dissolve the party, but a 1960 National Congress, in which Jadid was a delegate representing the then-unknown Military Committee, reversed the decision and called for the Ba'ath Party's reestablishment. The Congress also decided to improve relations with Nasser by democratising the UAR from within. A faction within the party, led by al-Hawrani, called for Syria's secession. The Military Committee did not succeed in its aims, and in September 1961 the UAR was dissolved. Nazim al-Kudsi, who led the first post-UAR government, persecuted Jadid and the others for their Nasserite loyalties, and all of them were forced to retire from the Syrian Army.

In 1963 Jadid was promoted from Lieutenant colonel to Major general and named Chief of Staff of the Armed Forces of Syria.

Downfall and death
In 1970, when conflict erupted between the Palestine Liberation Organization (PLO) and the Jordanian army, Jadid sent Syrian-controlled Palestinian troops of the nominally PLO-run Palestine Liberation Army, based in Syria, into Jordan to aid the PLO. This decision was not supported by Assad's right-wing Ba'ath faction, and the troops withdrew. The action helped trigger a simmering conflict between Jadid's and Assad's factions within the Ba'ath Party and army. The Syrian Communist Party aligned itself with Jadid, drawing him the support of Soviet ambassador, Nuritdin Mukhitdinov. Angered by this, Assad decided to scare the Soviets by sending Mustafa Tlass to Beijing to procure arms and wave Chairman Mao's Little Red Book. In November 1970, Jadid tried to fire Assad and his supporter Mustafa Tlass. Assad responded by launching an intra-party coup dubbed the Corrective Movement. Jadid was arrested on 13 November 1970, and remained in the Mezzeh prison in Damascus until dying from a heart attack on 19 August 1993.

References

Bibliography

1926 births
1993 deaths
Chiefs of Staff of the Syrian Army
Homs Military Academy alumni
Leaders ousted by a coup
Leaders who took power by coup
Members of the National Command of the Ba'ath Party
Members of the National Command of the Ba'ath Party (Syrian-dominated faction)
Members of the Regional Command of the Arab Socialist Ba'ath Party – Syria Region
People from Latakia
Prisoners and detainees of Syria
Syrian Alawites
Syrian Arab nationalists
Syrian generals
Muslim socialists
Heads of government who were later imprisoned